Frank Capsouras (born January 29, 1947) is an American weightlifter. He competed in the men's heavyweight event at the 1972 Summer Olympics.

Capsouras was a resident of River Edge, New Jersey. Capsouras won the national teen title at the age of 17, having started lifting at age 12. He attended River Dell Regional High School, where he was a competitive wrestler.

References

External links
 

1947 births
Living people
American male weightlifters
Olympic weightlifters of the United States
People from River Edge, New Jersey
River Dell Regional High School alumni
Weightlifters at the 1972 Summer Olympics
Sportspeople from Hackensack, New Jersey
Pan American Games medalists in weightlifting
Pan American Games bronze medalists for the United States
Weightlifters at the 1975 Pan American Games
20th-century American people
21st-century American people